, also known by his Chinese style name , was a bureaucrat of the Ryukyu Kingdom.

Ikegusuku Anrai was the third head of an aristocrat family called Mō-uji Ikegusuku Dunchi. His father Ikegusuku Antō, was a Sanshikan during Shō Gen and Shō Ei's reign.

Jana family launched a rebellion against King Shō Nei in 1592. He took part in suppressing this rebellion together with Kochinda-Higa Seizoku and Mabuni Ankō, and put down it successfully. All of them received ueekata, the highest rank in the yukatchu aristocracy of Ryukyu.

Satsuma invaded Ryukyu in the spring of 1609. When Satsuma troops approached Naha, he followed the sessei Gushichan Chōsei to hold peace talks with Satuma at Oyamise, but the peace proposal was rejected. After King Shō Nei's surrender, he was taken to Kagoshima together with King Shō Nei and a number of high officials by Satsuma troops. He returned to Ryukyu together with Gushichan Chōsei in the next year in order to deal with tributary affairs. Satsuma sent him to Ming China to pay tribute together with Kin Ōkai (also known as Gushi Pekumi ), but they tried to let Ming China get involved in secretly. Ming China refused to receive tribute from Ryukyu until King Shō Nei was released by Satsuma in the year 1611.

Ikegusuku took the place of Urasoe Chōshi and became a member of Sanshikan. In 1623, he was sent to China together with Sai Ken (also known as Kiyuna Pekumi ) to ask for investiture of King Shō Hō, and requested for permission to pay tribute once every five years. Ikegusuku was serious ill on the way home and died in Jiangnan.

References

1558 births
1623 deaths
Ueekata
Sanshikan
People of the Ryukyu Kingdom
Ryukyuan people
16th-century Ryukyuan people
17th-century Ryukyuan people